The Rio Negro is a river of Colombia. It is a tributary of the Magdalena River which drains into the Caribbean Sea.

See also
List of rivers of Colombia

Notes

References
Rand McNally, The New International Atlas, 1993.

Rivers of Colombia
Magdalena River
Geography of Cundinamarca Department